Subway was an American contemporary R&B group, which featured Keith Thomas and his brother Trerail Puckett, and their close friends, Eric McNeal and Roy Jones. The group was signed by Michael Bivins (of New Edition and Bell Biv DeVoe) to his Motown-distributed label Biv 10. They debuted in 1995 with the hit single "This Lil' Game We Play" featuring labelmates 702 that reached #15 on the Billboard charts. The song was produced and written by Gerald Levert and Edwin Nicholas and was billed as "Subway featuring 702". The single set the group off to a good start, going gold and selling nearly a million copies.

Their debut album was titled Good Times and was released later that year.

Eric McNeal released his debut solo EP in 2007 on Out The Box Records. Produced by Jim Tullio and Ricky Jacox.

Chart positions

Albums

Singles

References

African-American musical groups
American contemporary R&B musical groups
American boy bands
American rhythm and blues musical groups
Musical groups established in 1992
Musical groups disestablished in 1998
Motown artists
Musical groups from Chicago